The Public Library of New London is a historic library located at 63 Huntington Street at the corner of State Street, New London, Connecticut. The library was given to the city by Henry Philomen Haven. It was constructed in 1889-92 and was designed by Shepley, Rutan and Coolidge in the Richardsonian Romanesque style; George Warren Cole was the project supervisor.

The building was added to the National Register of Historic Places in 1970.

Design 
Whaling merchant Henry P. Haven died in 1876, and his money was to be split among his three children. However, his son Thomas had died, so Thomas' portion was put into a trust to be used for "charitable and benevolent purposes". The trustees of the Haven inheritance secured a charter in 1882 for a public library, and they hired Shepley, Rutan and Coolidge of Boston to design it.

Shepley, Rutan and Coolidge were the successors to architect Henry Hobson Richardson, and they worked from Richardson's preliminary designs in order to retain the popular Richardsonian architecture that is found in other libraries. The firm sent George Warren Cole to be the project supervisor. Cole also served as the supervisor of the Williams Memorial Institute and the Nathan Hale School. Work commenced in 1889 and it was completed and opened by July 1891.

Alteration and expansion 
The 1970 National Register of Historic Places nomination states that the building had not been altered with "one possible exception of an elevator" which seemed to date from the nineteenth century but "does not appear in the plans." However, the library added a 15,000 square foot extension in 1974. Further renovations increased the space for administrative offices and collections, concluding in March 2001. The Children's area and meeting rooms also underwent renovations in 2006.

See also
National Register of Historic Places listings in New London County, Connecticut

References

External links

 Official website

Library buildings completed in 1889
Libraries on the National Register of Historic Places in Connecticut
Libraries in New London County, Connecticut
Public libraries in Connecticut
Buildings and structures in New London, Connecticut
National Register of Historic Places in New London County, Connecticut
Richardsonian Romanesque architecture in Connecticut